Killarney Airport  is located adjacent to the town of Killarney, Ontario, Canada.

The airport was originally funded by the province and now from donations from aircraft landing at the airstrip.

A small building is located at the airport with a telephone booth at the gates. An AV gas tank and tool shed are the only other structures at the airport.

References

Registered aerodromes in Ontario
Transport in Sudbury District
Buildings and structures in Sudbury District